Gabriel Potra is a Paralympian athlete from Portugal. He mainly competes in category T12 sprint events.

He competed in the 2000 Summer Paralympics in Sydney, Australia.  There he won a gold medal in the men's 200 metres - T12 event, a gold medal in the men's 4 x 400 metre relay - T13 event, a bronze medal in the men's 100 metres - T12 event and went out in the semi-finals of the men's 400 metres - T12 event.  He also competed at the 2004 Summer Paralympics in Athens, Greece.  , went out in the semi-finals of the men's 200 metres - T12 event, went out in the first round of the men's 400 metres - T12 event and went out in the first round of the men's 4 x 100 metre relay - T11-13 event.  He also competed at the 2008 Summer Paralympics in Beijing, China.  , went out in the semi-finals of the men's 200 metres - T12 event, was disqualified in   the men's 4 x 100 metre relay - T11-13 event and finished twelfth in the men's Pentathlon - P12 event

External links
 

Paralympic athletes of Portugal
Athletes (track and field) at the 2000 Summer Paralympics
Athletes (track and field) at the 2004 Summer Paralympics
Athletes (track and field) at the 2008 Summer Paralympics
Athletes (track and field) at the 2012 Summer Paralympics
Paralympic gold medalists for Portugal
Paralympic bronze medalists for Portugal
Living people
Medalists at the 2000 Summer Paralympics
Portuguese male sprinters
Year of birth missing (living people)
Paralympic medalists in athletics (track and field)